The first cabinet of Theodor Rosetti was the government of Romania from 22 March to 11 November 1888.

Ministers
The ministers of the cabinet were as follows:

President of the Council of Ministers:
Theodor Rosetti (22 March - 11 November 1888)
Minister of the Interior: 
Theodor Rosetti (22 March - 11 November 1888)
Minister of Foreign Affairs: 
Petre P. Carp (22 March - 11 November 1888)
Minister of Finance:
Menelas Ghermani (22 March - 11 November 1888)
Minister of Justice:
Alexandru Marghiloman (22 March - 11 November 1888)
Minister of War:
Gen. Constantin Barozzi (22 March - 11 November 1888)
Minister of Religious Affairs and Public Instruction:
Titu Maiorescu (22 March - 11 November 1888)
Minister of Public Works:
Alexandru B. Știrbei (22 March - 11 November 1888)
Minister of Agriculture, Trade, Industry and Commerce:
 (interim) Titu Maiorescu (22 March - 4 June 1888)
 (interim) Petre P. Carp (4 June - 11 November 1888)

References

Cabinets of Romania
Cabinets established in 1888
Cabinets disestablished in 1888
1888 establishments in Romania
1888 disestablishments in Romania